is a Japanese snowboarder. He competed in the 2018 Winter Olympics. In 2017, his World Snowboard Tour Ranking is 30th. In 2018, his World Snowboard Tour Ranking was 19th and in Big Air 12th. He was a member of the Japan's Snowboard team competing at the 2022 Winter Olympics.

References

2002 births
Living people
Snowboarders at the 2018 Winter Olympics
Snowboarders at the 2022 Winter Olympics
Japanese male snowboarders
Olympic snowboarders of Japan
21st-century Japanese people